The Hispaniolan slider (Trachemys decorata) or Haitian slider is a species of turtle in the family Emydidae found on the island of Hispaniola  (Haiti and the Dominican Republic).

Habitat
The Hispaniolan slider is a freshwater turtle. They can live on land and water, but prefer to be near freshwater.

Conservation
These sliders are not on the endangered list, but are considered vulnerable.

Diet
They have a particular diet that consists of insects (crickets), fish, vegetation, etc. When kept in captivity, they can eat all of the same foods that they would eat normally, as well as turtle pellets, carrots, tomatoes, peeled grapes, and spinach.

Appearance
Unlike red-eared sliders, they do not have red patches on their heads. They have distinct light and dark stripes on their necks, feet, and tails. The tops of their shells are brown and the bottoms are yellow.

References

 "World Chelonian Trust - Trachemys Gallery.", World Chelonian Trust - Turtle and Tortoise Conservation and Care. Web. 5 March (2010).

Trachemys
Endemic fauna of Hispaniola
Reptiles of the Dominican Republic
Reptiles of Haiti
Reptiles described in 1940
Taxonomy articles created by Polbot